AANC may refer to:

 Affaires autochtones et du Nord Canada (Indigenous and Northern Affairs Canada)
 American Association of Nutritional Consultants, a professional organization